Samburupithecus is an extinct primate that lived in Kenya during the middle to late Miocene. The type specimen KNM-SH 8531 was discovered by the Joint Japan-Kenya Expedition at the SH22 fossil site in the Samburu District, a locality where several other researchers found no ape fossils.

Samburupithecus lived during the so-called "African ape gap" , a period from which very few hominoid fossils have been found in Africa until relatively recently.  This apparent gap, however, is now populated by a diversity of apes such as Nakalipithecus,  Chororapithecus abyssinicus, Otavipithecus, and Nacholapithecus.

Characteristics
 
Paleoenvironmental reconstructions indicate that Samburupithecus most likely lived in a wooded habitat surrounded by savannah.

Defining cranial traits of this genus include low, broad zygomatics, straight alveolar process and large maxillary sinus.  Defining dental traits include three-rooted premolars, thick enamel and bunodont cusps.

The teeth in the Samburupithecus type maxilla are comparable in size to those of the type mandible of Nakalipithecus, roughly the size of a modern female gorilla.  The upper premolars of both are elongated mesiodistally (along the row of teeth), but those of Samburupithecus have more inflated cusps that are positioned more centrally, so that occlusal foveae and basins (depressions at top of teeth) are very restricted.  This suggests that Samburupithecus was strongly specialized compared to other Miocene and extant apes.  Another distinguishing feature between the two is the higher relief of the dentine/enamel junction in Samburupithecus.

These elongated teeth are unlike many other Miocene hominoids, linking Samburupithecus the taxon to gorillas, chimpanzees and hominins, but its relationships within this clade is at present unclear. Because of this mixture of primitive and derived traits in the KNM-SH 8531 specimen, it has been proposed that Samburupithecus lived before the gorilla-chimpanzee-hominin split and, therefore, that it is a common ancestor to these primates alongside Ouranopithecus.

See also
List of fossil sites (with link directory)
 List of human evolution fossils (with images)

Notes

References

 
 
 
 
 
 
 
 

Miocene mammals of Africa
Prehistoric apes
Miocene primates of Africa
Fauna of Kenya
Fossil taxa described in 1997
Monotypic prehistoric primate genera
Prehistoric primate genera